Palmitoyltransferase ZDHHC17 is an enzyme that contains a DHHC domain that in humans is encoded by the ZDHHC17 gene.

Interactions 

ZDHHC17 has been shown to interact with Huntingtin.

References

Further reading